Ralph Keyes (born March 1, 1961 in Cork, Ireland) is a retired rugby union player who won eight caps playing at fly-half for the Irish rugby union side. 
He made his international test debut at the age of 24 on 1 March 1986 against England in the 1986 Five Nations Championship. It was his last match until selection for the 1991 Rugby World Cup during which he played 4 matches and scored 68 points, the highest of any player during that tournament. He then played three matches in the following years Five Nations Championship before losing his place in the starting line-up.

External links

Ralph Keyes on Sporting Heroes

1961 births
Irish rugby union players
Living people
Rugby union fly-halves
Ireland international rugby union players
RTÉ Sports Person of the Year winners